Carpophilus mutilatus, known generally as the confused sap beetle or flower beetle, is a species of sap-feeding beetle in the family Nitidulidae. It is found in Oceania, Europe, North America, and temperate Asia.

References

Further reading

External links

 

Nitidulidae
Articles created by Qbugbot
Beetles described in 1843